The vice president of the People's Republic of China, commonly called the vice president of China, is a senior position in the government of the People's Republic of China. The incumbent vice president of China is Han Zheng, who took office in 2023.

Selection and powers 
The office was created by the 1982 constitution. Formally, the vice president is elected by the National People's Congress in accordance with Article 62 of the Constitution. In practice, this election falls into the category of single-candidate elections. The candidate is recommended by the Presidium of the National People's Congress, which also theoretically has the power to recall the vice president.

By law, the vice president must be a Chinese citizen of 45 years of age or older. Prior to March 2018, he or she cannot serve for over two terms, a term being the equivalent of one session of the NPC, which is five years.

The vice president's duties include assisting the President, and replacing him should he resign or die in office. In reality the position of the vice president is mostly ceremonial; Vice Presidents Zeng Qinghong, Hu Jintao, and Xi Jinping have been members of the Politburo Standing Committee of the Chinese Communist Party (CCP) and the Central Secretariat, the country's main decision making bodies; these three served concurrently as the first-ranked Secretary of the Secretariat, in charge of party affairs.

The vice president may play a major role in foreign affairs. For instance, the vice president generally sits on the Foreign Affairs Leading Group, a policy coordination body of the CCP. The vice president has also typically sits on the Central Coordination Group for Hong Kong and Macau Affairs. Therefore, while the vice president may not actually have substantive powers as defined in the Constitution, the office nonetheless carries significance and prestige. The holders of the office have all been individuals with a degree of political clout.

Vice President Li Yuanchao was a member of the CCP Politburo until 2017, but not the Standing Committee. His successor, Wang Qishan, was a retired member of the Standing Committee at the time of his ascension. Han Zheng, who succeeded Wang Qishan as the vice president in 2023, was also a retired member of the politburo standing committee at the time of his ascension.

List of vice presidents 
 Generations of leadership

Central People's Government (1949–1954) 
 Vice Chairmen of the Central People's Government
 (co-serving, 1 October 1949 – 27 September 1954)
 Zhu De
 Liu Shaoqi
 Song Qingling
 Li Jishen
 Zhang Lan
 Gao Gang (until his suicide on 17 August 1954)

The 1st Constitution (1954–1975)

The 4th Constitution (1982–present)

References

See also 

 President of the People's Republic of China (list)
 Political position ranking of the People's Republic of China
 Paramount leader of China
 List of premiers of the People's Republic of China
 List of vice premiers of the People's Republic of China
 List of current vice presidents

 
Vice President
Vice presidents
1954 establishments in China